John Werner is the founder of Ideas in Action, Inc. (IIA) and Managing Director at Link Ventures and Chief Network Officer, SVP of Corporate Development at Cogo Labs in Cambridge Ma. Prior he was a Vice President at an augmented reality company. He is also founding Managing Director for MIT Media Lab's Emerging Worlds Special Interest Group (SIG), and former Head of Innovation and New Ventures for the Camera Culture Group at the MIT Media Lab for Ramesh Raskar, director of the Camera Culture Group at MIT Media Lab. He is one of the founding members of the non-profit organization Citizen Schools (founded in 1995) and the curator of TEDxBeaconStreet, and TEDxMIT with Daniela Rus - both independent event licensed by TED as part of TEDx. He started first ever AR-in-Action Augmented Reality Conference "ARIA" at MIT Media Lab in January 2017 and Blockchain+AI+Human = Magic Summit, now called Imagination in Action at MIT and Davos which he curates with Professor Sandy Pentland.

Early life and education
Werner was born in 1970 in New York City. His father John F. Werner was the chief clerk and CEO of the Supreme Court in New York County, and his mother Laura A. Werner was an Assistant Attorney General in New York State.  His brother, Jeffrey Werner, is the Deputy General Counsel for the New York City Mayor's Office of Management and Budget. His sister, Margaret DeVoe, is a Senior Counsel at New York City Law Department.

Werner attended school at the Trinity School NYC for 13 years where he was a class Senator, and a multi-year Varsity Letter earner for Cross Country, Swimming (Co-Captain) and Lacrosse. He was awarded the Holden Cup, the honor for top athlete in the Senior Class at Trinity.

Werner received a degree from Hamilton College (New York) in 1992. He also co-organized the Hamilton's successful campaign to set a Guinness record for the most people swimming in a 24-hour relay, setting the record at 1:42 AM on April 8, 1989.

In 2008, Werner was recipient of the Loeb Fellowship at the Harvard Graduate School of Design.

In 1988, Werner gained notability at Hamilton when, as a first-year student, he organized the first ever successful completion of a class-wide challenge issued yearly by Dan Chambliss, Professor of Sociology: If no one in his course showed up for the final exam, all of them would receive an A on it. But, if even one student took it, anyone who didn't would receive a zero. A variation on the prisoner's dilemma, Chambliss said. "And I think the only reason that it happened was that [Werner] was totally committed to making it happen." After obtaining a roster for both sections of the course from the Registrar, Werner created a "contract" for students to sign and showed up "ready to tackle anyone who tried to go in." Seven students waited outside the testing room, hedging their bets in case anyone broke ranks, but none did. All students in Sociology 101 received A's on their final exams that year. This was a defining experience for Werner; "After I organized this, I began to believe I could organize anything,". Professor Chambliss did not offer the challenge again.

Career
As the Head of Innovation and New Ventures of Camera Culture Group at MIT Media Lab, Werner actively spearheaded REDX (Rethinking Engineering Design Execution) and Kumbhathon initiatives.

Werner worked with the Wediko Children Services, a school for behaviorally disturbed children in New Hampshire, where he was a Principal of the School (Mayor of Think City), before moving on to teaching special education in a Boston public school.  He also worked on the gubernatorial campaign of Mark Roosevelt who won the Massachusetts State primary.  Later, he and Eric Schwarz, Ned Rimer, and Anita Price developed a program that would become Citizen Schools. Werner was the first employee hired by Founder and CEO Schwarz. He was the first Executive Director for the organization, he also served as Chief Mobilizing Officer and Managing Director at Citizen Schools. He also founded an 8th grade academy that lead to the successful Writing program in Citizen Schools, which went on to take 400 lawyers and teach them to be writing coaches for children at Citizen Schools.

As an Executive Curator of TEDxBoston, Werner and a community engagement team worked independently to highlight the innovative thinking that the Boston region produces. Werner and four others led a team of volunteers and produced TEDxBoston 2010. While at TEDxBoston, Werner piloted a set of TED related excursions in the Boston area known as Adventures. These excursions included visits to local start-ups, well-established companies, research labs, and universities. As of 2015, 5500 people have gone on Adventures. Now, Werner curates TEDxBeaconStreet, which has amassed over 100 million views online, and continues to run the Adventures program at TEDxBeaconStreet (365+ to date, 10,000 participants).  He also is the co-licence holder of TEDxMIT with Professor Daniela Rus. He is also part of the TEDx board of advisors and TED ED braintrust helping to form connections between TED and K-12 education. Additionally, has spoken at TED University and TED ED and TED Global, he nominates and supports TED Fellows, individuals with innovative ideas in the middle of their careers work to fulfill their research or performance goals with TED's help.

Other positions that Werner has held include directing the program at Dever Elementary School, Woodrow Wilson Middle School and Garfield Elementary School.

In July 2013, Werner left Citizen Schools to be the Head of Innovation and New Ventures for the Camera Culture Group at the MIT Media Lab for Ramesh Raskar, director of the Camera Culture Group at MIT Media Lab. John is a Managing Director of Link Ventures and Chief Network Officer at Cogo Labs. John is a founding Board Member of a non-profit Path Check Inc.

On October 28, 2021, Werner merges TEDxBeaconStreet with TEDxBoston after TED grants him the city licence. 
He creates a series of events with both audiences in the Spring of 2022 at the Quin House on March 7 and on May 16, 2022.

AR in Action and Ideas in Action Series 

John was acknowledged by Forbes, NPR, NYU and MIT for first ever 'AR-in-Action Augmented Reality Conference' at MIT Media Lab in January 2017 New York University appreciated his efforts and hosted second edition of AR in Action at Forbes Building in June 2017. Werner also founded Ideas in Action, Inc. (IIA) in 2012, a nonprofit connecting people around the world to inspire and set meaningful ideas into action throughout their communities.

Imagination in Action
Werner hosts "Imagination in Action Web3 Summit" to talk about Web3.

Involvement with India
At the MIT Media Lab, Werner was one of the spearheads of the Rethinking Engineering and Design (REDX) and Kumbhathon initiatives. John helped launch three Innovation Centers in India and travelling there 12 times in three years. Innovations coming out of the Khumbathon include technologies to prevent stampedes, provide food and shelter, and prevent disease spread at the crowded Kumbh mela. Werner has stated that the goal of the project is to expand to places other than the Kumbhmela, saying "The next step will be to identify the [other] areas facing issues and finding out solutions with the help of technology"  He has also served as a mentor to students at MIT like Sudhanshu Nath Mishra on their projects for the Kumbhathon.

Fellowships and awards
 Recipient of MIT Connection Science Fellowship, MIT School of Engineering
 Recipient of the Loeb Fellowship (1 of 10) at the Harvard Graduate School of Design in 2008
 Recognized by the Harvard Business Review for his leadership
 Recognized as top 50 on Fire in Boston by BostonInno in 2014
 Named as one of the 10 Innovators Deconstructing Education Brick by Brick by BusinessInnovationFactory.com in 2012
 Recognized by The Boston Junior Chamber of Commerce (Boston Jaycees) with a TOYL Award in 2006
 Earned the New England Isuzu Afterschool Hero of the Year award in 2001 sponsored by the Afterschool Alliance in Washington, D.C., and the Entertainment Industry Foundation
 Came fourth in 140.3 mile Ironman Plymouth Rock Triathlon. (he has participated in 8 full Ironman (PR 10:19) and 70 half Ironman (PR 4:30) races

References

American nonprofit executives
Living people
1970 births